Frog City Software, Inc. was an American video game developer based in San Francisco, California. The company was founded in 1994 by Rachel Bernstein, Bill Spieth and Ted Spieth, acquired by Take-Two Interactive in 2003, became part of the 2K label in 2005, and was closed down in 2006.

History 
Frog City Software was founded by Rachel Bernstein, Bill Spieth and Ted Spieth in 1994. In 2003, following the release of Tropico 2: Pirate Cove, Frog City Software was acquired by Take-Two Interactive. On January 25, 2005, Take-Two Interactive announced the opening of publishing label 2K, which would henceforth manage their development studios, including Frog City Software.

On June 6, 2006, Snow, a game about drug trafficking in development at Frog City Software at the time, was canceled. It was presumed that the move occurred as an immediate consequence of the 2005 Hot Coffee controversy. Frog City Software shut down later that year. Veterans of the studio established Sidecar Studios as a successor but disbanded a year later to pursue other interests.

Games developed

Cancelled 

Pantheon
Snow

References 

2K (company)
Companies based in San Francisco
Defunct companies based in the San Francisco Bay Area
Defunct video game companies of the United States
Take-Two Interactive divisions and subsidiaries
Video game companies disestablished in 2006
Video game companies established in 1994
Video game development companies